The YTV Achievement Awards (aka YAA!) was an annual awards ceremony presented by YTV. The ceremony took place annually (except 1991) from 1989 to 2000. The awards were given to young Canadians who had an important contribution in one of several diverse categories. 

For each awards year, there is an nomination period. Entrants could nominate themselves, or be nominated by someone else. Nominees were required to be 19 or younger. Finalists and winners in each category were selected from the nominees list by a panel of judges.

Award categories

Dates and locations

Awards

1st Annual YTV Achievement Awards (1989)
Winners are listed first, highlighted in boldface, and indicated with a double dagger (‡).

2nd Annual YTV Achievement Awards (1990)
Winners are listed first, highlighted in boldface, and indicated with a double dagger (‡).

3rd Annual YTV Achievement Awards (1992)
Winners are listed first, highlighted in boldface, and indicated with a double dagger (‡).

4th Annual YTV Achievement Awards (1993)
Winners are listed first, highlighted in boldface, and indicated with a double dagger (‡).

5th Annual YTV Achievement Awards (1994)
Winners are listed first, highlighted in boldface, and indicated with a double dagger (‡).

6th Annual YTV Achievement Awards (1995)
Winners are listed first, highlighted in boldface, and indicated with a double dagger (‡).

7th Annual YTV Achievement Awards (1996)
Winners are listed first, highlighted in boldface, and indicated with a double dagger (‡).

8th Annual YTV Achievement Awards (1997)
Winners are listed first, highlighted in boldface, and indicated with a double dagger (‡).

9th Annual YTV Achievement Awards (1998)
Winners are listed first, highlighted in boldface, and indicated with a double dagger (‡).

10th Annual YTV Achievement Awards (1999)
Winners are listed first, highlighted in boldface, and indicated with a double dagger (‡).

11th Annual YTV Achievement Awards (2000)
Winners are listed first, highlighted in boldface, and indicated with a double dagger (‡).

References

1989 establishments in Canada
2000 disestablishments in Canada
Awards established in 1989
Awards disestablished in 2000
YTV (Canadian TV channel)